The 2021 Malacca state election, formally the 15th Malacca state election, took place on 20 November 2021. This election was to elect 28 members of the 15th Malacca State Legislative Assembly. The previous assembly was dissolved on 4 October 2021.

The snap election of the state was called prematurely following a political crisis. It came after four members of the assembly (MLA) who had previously supported incumbent Chief Minister Sulaiman Md Ali announced the loss of confidence and withdrawal of their support for him on 4 October 2021. They are former Chief Minister, Member of the State Executive Council (EXCO), Sungai Udang MLA Idris Haron and Pantai Kundor MLA Nor Azman Hassan from BN, independent (IND) EXCO member, Pengkalan Batu MLA Norhizam Hassan Baktee as well as EXCO member, Telok Mas MLA Noor Effandi Ahmad from PN.

Malacca became the fourth state in Malaysia (since 2021) that did not hold a state election simultaneously with the general election after Sabah (1967–1999 and since 2020), Sarawak (since 1979), and Kelantan (March 1978). This is also the first election following Ismail Sabri Yaakob's appointment as Prime Minister on 21 August 2021 and also the first state election held in the Malay Peninsula since the fall of the Pakatan Harapan state and federal governments in 2020.

This election was unique because it featured two major coalition parties in the government, namely Barisan Nasional and Perikatan Nasional, competing against each other. BN, through UMNO, had announced that it would not cooperate with Perikatan Nasional, led by Parti Peribumi Bersatu Malaysia (BERSATU). Such competition between former coalition partners had previously only occurred in East Malaysia.

Barisan Nasional (BN) won a landslide victory in the state election, winning 21 seats in the legislature and a two-thirds majority. Pakatan Harapan (PH) suffered a major defeat, winning just 5 seats, with the People's Justice Party (PKR) losing all its contested seats. Perikatan Nasional (PN) won 2 seats.

Constituencies

Composition before dissolution

Electoral system 
Elections in Malaysia are conducted at the federal and state levels. Federal elections elect members of the Dewan Rakyat, the lower house of Parliament, while state elections in each of the 13 states elect members of their respective state legislative assembly. As Malaysia follows the Westminster system of government, the head of government (Prime Minister at the federal level and the Menteri Besar/Chief Ministers at the state level) is the person who commands the confidence of the majority of members in the respective legislature – this is normally the leader of the party or coalition with the majority of seats in the legislature.

The Legislative Assembly consists of 28 members, known as Members of the Legislative Assembly (MLAs), that are elected for five-year terms. Each MLA is elected from a single-member constituencies using the first-past-the-post voting system; each constituency contains approximately an equal number of voters. If one party obtains a majority of seats, then that party is entitled to form the government, with its leader becoming the Chief Minister. In the event of a hung parliament, where no single party obtains the majority of seats, the government may still form through a coalition or a confidence and supply agreement with other parties. In practice, coalitions and alliances in Malaysia, and by extension, in Malacca, generally persist between elections, and member parties do not normally contest for the same seats.

Political parties

Retiring incumbent 
The following members of the 14th State Legislative Assembly retired.

Timeline

Pre-nomination events

Electoral candidates

Note: 1Independent candidates form 'Gagasan Bebas' informal Independent bloc and contested using the various symbols.

Results

By parliamentary constituency
Barisan Nasional won 4 of 6 parliamentary constituency, including Masjid Tanah and Alor Gajah, which is held by Perikatan Nasional and Tangga Batu, which is held by Pakatan Harapan.

Seats that changed allegiance

Election pendulum

See also 
 Politics of Malaysia
 List of political parties in Malaysia

References 
 Urusan Pilihan Raya Umum Dewan Undangan Negeri (PRU DUN) Melaka Yang Ke-15

2021 elections in Malaysia
2021
November 2021 events in Asia